Cyberpunk is a literary subgenre of science fiction.

Cyberpunk may also refer to:
 Cyberpunk (novel), a science fiction short story originally written by Bruce Bethke in 1980 that coined the word "cyberpunk"
 Cyberpunk (role-playing game), a 1988 tabletop game written by Mike Pondsmith
 GURPS Cyberpunk, a 1990 genre toolkit for role-playing games
 Cyberpunk (album), a 1993 album by Billy Idol
 Cyberpunks (video game), a 1993 shooter game for the Amiga computer
Cyberpunk 2077, a 2020 role-playing video game developed by CD Projekt Red, based on the role-playing game by Mike Pondsmith
 Cyberpunk: Edgerunners, a 2022 anime series based on the video game Cyberpunk 2077

See also 
 Cybergoth, a fashion and music subculture
 Cyberpunx, a comic book series
 Cypherpunk, a type of social activist